The California Army National Guard (CA ARNG) is one of three components of the California National Guard, a reserve of the United States Army, and part of the National Guard of the United States. The California Army National Guard is composed of 18,450 soldiers. Nationwide, the Army National Guard comprises approximately one half of the US Army's available combat forces and approximately one third of its support organization. National coordination of various state National Guard units are maintained through the National Guard Bureau.

California Army National Guard units are trained and equipped as part of the United States Army. The same enlisted and officer ranks and insignia are used and National Guardsmen are eligible to receive all United States military awards. The California Army National Guard also bestows a number of state awards for local services rendered in or to the state of California.

Units
40th Infantry Division
79th Infantry Brigade Combat Team (United States) (79th IBCT)
1st Battalion, 160th Infantry Regiment
1st Battalion, 184th Infantry Regiment
 1st Squadron, 18th Cavalry Regiment
1st Battalion, 143rd Field Artillery Regiment (1-143rd FAR)
578th Brigade Engineer Battalion (578th BEB)
40th Brigade Support Battalion (40th BSB)
 65th Infantry Regiment .1/65th. (Puerto Rico National Guard) 1st Battalion: Company’s  A,B,C,D and HHC. (Reg. Temporarily Attached)
40th Combat Aviation Brigade (40th CAB)
 Company C, 1st Battalion, 168th Aviation Regiment (HH-60L)
Company B, 1st Battalion, 126th Aviation Regiment (CH-47F)
 1st Battalion, 140th Aviation Regiment (United States)
 HHC and Company A, 3rd Battalion, 140th Aviation Regiment (United States)
640th Aviation Support Battalion (640th ASB)
100th Troop Command
223rd Military Intelligence Battalion (223rd MIB)
250th Expeditionary Military Intelligence Battalion (250th EMIB)
1st Battalion, 144th Field Artillery Regiment (1-144th FAR)
1st Battalion, 185th Infantry Regiment
49th Military Police Brigade (49th MPB)
185th Military Police Battalion (185th MPB)
143rd Military Police Battalion (143rd MPB)
579th Engineer Battalion (579th EN BN)
224th Sustainment Brigade
223rd Regimental Training Institute (223rd RTI)
115th Regional Support Group (115th RSG)
Special Operations Detachment-North (SOD-N)
Company A, 5/19th Special Forces Group

History

Formation of the California State Militia and its early years

The California Army National Guard was formed with the passing of the Militia Act of 1903, also known as the Dick Act. Prior to that time, the California Army Guard originated from the state militia established by the Constitution of California in 1849. On 4 April 1850, the first California Legislature in San Jose adopted enabling legislation formally establishing a militia of volunteer or independent companies. The law required every free, white, able-bodied male citizen of the State to perform military duty or to pay a $2 fee for nonperformance of this duty. Such payment exempted the person from duty except in case of war, insurrection, invasion, assistance to the sheriff, or a requisition of the militia. It provided that a judge of the superior court of a county should cause a suitable person to open a book, and enter the names of persons who apply and are able to perform military duty. After required notice, the volunteers were to be organized, and their officers and non-commissioned officers selected by election. The volunteer or independent companies were to be armed and equipped as in the Army of the United States. The units were to adopt a constitution and by-laws as well as rules and regulations for the government of its personnel and determination of fines and penalties to enforce them.

The legislature then provided for the organization of these enrolled state militia, volunteers or independent companies into four divisions, each commanded by a major general and consisting of two brigades, with a statewide adjutant general responsible to the Governor of California. From 1852, the Quartermaster General of California was subsumed under the office of Adjutant General of California, when William H. Richardson resigned and Quartermaster General William Chauncey Kibbe became adjutant general by a law of 1852.

The first unit, known as the First California Guard (officially Company A, First Regiment, Light Artillery), was formed from volunteers in San Francisco, California under Captain Henry Morris Naglee on 27 July 1849, as a territorial militia. It was the first company organized under state authority. Under these regulations, 307 volunteer or independent companies were organized in the early years of the states history to oppose the Indians, hunt down bandits, quell riots or Vigilantes, protect officials, intervene in mining claim disputes and other civil disturbances.

During 1850, Governor Burnett called out the militia two times. The first was prompted by incidents involving the Yuma Indians at the confluence of the Gila and Colorado rivers on 23 April 1850; in response, the Governor ordered the sheriffs of San Diego County and Los Angeles County to organize a total of 100 men for the Gila Expedition to "pursue such energetic measures to punish the Indians, bring them to terms, and protect the emigrants on their way to California." The second instance occurred in October 1850, when Governor Burnett ordered the sheriff of El Dorado County to muster 200 men. The commanders were instructed to "proceed to punish the Indians engaged in the late attacks in the vicinity of Ringgold, and along the emigrant trail leading from Salt Lake to California."

From 1850 to 1851 the Mariposa Battalion was raised to fight the Mariposa War in the Sierras.

In 1851, the Garra Revolt occurred in San Diego County and the Governor called for troops, the Fitzgerald Volunteers were raised in San Diego to defend the County and conducted an expedition to Warners Ranch. Also two companies of Rangers were organized in San Francisco from members of the three militia companies that existed in that city then: First California Guard, Washington Guard and Empire Guard. However, by the time transportation to San Diego was arranged the revolt had been suppressed, and the now idle volunteers caused more trouble in San Diego than the Indians.

In 1853, a company of California State Rangers was organized for the purpose of capturing the famous bandit Joaquin Murrieta. At the same time Los Angeles County formed two companies, Los Angeles Rangers and the Los Angeles Guard. In 1854 the Monte Rangers were formed. During 1855 in San Bernardino County the San Bernardino Rough and Ready Cavalry was formed, replaced in 1856 by the San Bernardino Rangers. These units were raised to support the local authorities in combating Indian raids and the influx of criminals into Southern California, driven out of the northern part of the state by vigilantism in San Francisco and the Gold Country.

In 1854, the six companies in San Francisco, were formed into a battalion. In 1855, the militia was again reorganized. Provision was made for six divisions and 12 brigades. More extended military rolls were to be kept by the county assessors of each county.

In 1855, six California militia units were raised or mobilized in Humboldt and Klamath Counties for defense of the inhabitants in the Klamath and Salmon River War.

In 1856, Tulare Mounted Riflemen, a California State Militia unit of Tulare County, fought the Yokuts in the Tule River War.

In the winter in early 1858, a number of militia companies were raised for the Utah War, which was settled in by that spring before they could become involved.

In 1858-59, Captain Isaac G. Messec and his company, the Trinity Rangers fought the Klamath & Humboldt Expedition against the Whilkut or Redwood Indians.

In 1859, the Kibbe Rangers under William Byrnes and local posses fought the Pitt River Expedition against the Achomawi (Pit River) and Atsugewi (Hat Creek) tribes.

In 1860 the Independent City Guard and another company of volunteers from Sacramento, and the Nevada Rifles from Nevada City joined the Washoe Regiment and fought in the Carson River Expedition in the Paiute War.

Civil War

As the secession crisis developed in early 1861, several Volunteer Companies of the California Militia had disbanded because of divided loyalties and new ones with loyal Union men were sworn in across the state under the supervision of County sheriffs and judges. Many of these units saw no action but some were to form the companies of the earliest California Volunteer Regiments. Others like the Petaluma Guard and Emmet Rifles in Sonoma County suppressed a secessionist disturbance in Healdsburg, in 1862. Union commanders relied on the San Bernardino Mounted Rifles to hold the pro southern San Bernardino County for the Union in late 1861 as federal troops were being withdrawn and replaced by California Volunteers.

Notable as the only active pro-Southern militia unit, the Los Angeles Mounted Rifles was organized on 7 March 1861, in Los Angeles County. It included more than a few Californios in its leadership and its ranks including the County Sheriff, one of his Undersheriffs and several of his deputies. A. J. King another Undersheriff of Los Angeles County (and former member of the earlier "Monte Rangers") and other influential men in El Monte, formed another secessionist militia the Monte Mounted Rifles on 23 March 1861. However, the attempt failed when A. J. King marched through the streets following news of the Battle of Fort Sumter with a portrait of the Confederate General P. G. T. Beauregard and was arrested by a U.S. Marshal. State arms sent from Governor John G. Downey for the unit were held up by Union officers at the port of San Pedro. Due to the activities of secessionists within companies and disappearance of arms with the Los Angeles Mounted Rifles, the Legislature passed a law giving the Governor the power to recover from any company its arms and equipment to prevent traitors from getting possession of state arms.

In 1862, the crisis of the American Civil War compelled the militia to be reorganized. Volunteer companies were to be reorganized, classified, assigned to militia battalions and regiments and staffs were to be provided to them. Administration was improved, bonds required, military duty exacted, enrollments and assessments created, muster rolls defined, activation of the militia determined, disciplinary procedure adopted, courts-martial provided, compensation fixed, arms and equipment provided, and prior conflicting acts repealed.

During the Civil War 88 militia companies had been formed to serve, if required, in their respective localities, or to respond to a call from the governor. However, by the end of the Civil War only two of the six Divisions were active and only six of the twelve Brigades of which only the 2nd, 3rd, and 4th Brigades were organized into battalions and regiments.

Later 19th Century
In 1866, the Legislature for the first time employed the term "National Guard" as the title of the organized uniformed troops of the State of California. The statute provided for the organization of the National Guard, General and Special Staffs, formations of companies, service, arms and equipment, created a Board of Organization, formed a Board of Military Auditors, adopted a system of instruction and drill, described in detail the duties of the Adjutant General, created privileges and exemptions, allowances and expenses, limited the issuance of arms to troops only, provided for military musters and active service.

Early 20th Century
The Militia Act of 1903 organized the various state militias into the present National Guard system. Between the wars the 79th Infantry Brigade existed in the state, with the 159th and 184th Infantry Regiments.

The California Army National Guard played an important role in World War II. One of the most illustrious California military units, the 40th Infantry Division, fought against the Imperial Japanese in the Pacific. California's 184th Infantry Regiment also fought in the Pacific Theater. The 40th Tank Company took part in the defense of Luzon, but was forced to surrender at Bataan. CA National Guard units also found themselves in the European theater of the war. The 144th Field Artillery Group and 159th Infantry Regiment both fought in one of the most infamous battles of the war, the Battle of the Bulge.

Soon after World War II the 49th Infantry Division was organized in the state, but it disappeared after later reorganization. On 1 February 1976, the 49th Infantry Brigade, California Army National Guard, was redesignated the 49th MP Brigade at Alameda, California.

Post World War II 
As the Vietnam War escalated, increased personnel requirements in Southeast Asia necessitated mobilizations and deployments of Army National Guard units. California was not exempt from this. Both 1st Squadron, 18th Armored Cavalry Regiment and the 40th Aviation Company received mobilization orders. Despite being trained at Fort Lewis, Washington, the 18th Armored Cavalry never went to Vietnam. Instead, their gear was equipped to units of the Army of the Republic of Vietnam. The 18th Armored Cavalry was sent back to California, though many of its members went on to serve in Vietnam.

Units and members of the California Army National Guard have served in: World War I, World War II, Korean War, the Vietnam War, Operation Desert Storm and Desert Shield, Bosnia, Kosovo, Afghanistan, Iraq, Guantanamo Bay, Sinai Peninsula, Qatar, Germany, Spain, Panama, Ukraine, Kyrgyzstan, Kuwait, during the L.A. Riots, on the US/Mexico Border mission, during Hurricane Katrina humanitarian efforts, in airports and seaports around California, in various military bases across the US in support of Homeland Security, and more.

Modern Day Mission

Global War on Terror 
California Army National Guard units have been active in the Middle East since the U.S. military increased its involvement in the region. In September 2017, about 300 Army National Guard soldiers of the 184th Infantry Battalion deployed to Jordan to take part in Operation Spartan Shield. Modesto's 1st Battalion, 184th Infantry Regiment is one of the most active California Army National Guard units, having been mobilized or deployed to Kosovo, Iraq, and Jordan within the past decade.

Most recently, March 2019 saw the return of the CA ARNG's 40th Infantry Division from a 9-month tour in Afghanistan. This was the second rotation of troops to return from Afghanistan, and the 40th Infantry Division's first combat deployment since the Korean War.

Natural Disaster Relief 
As with any state's National Guard, one of the California Army National Guard's primary tasks is to ensure the safety of its citizens in times of crisis. According to the CA ARNG's website, the Guard is "committed to improving, preparing and protecting our communities, state and nation". In response to the Camp Fire, California activated 700 soldiers in different support roles. Fires are some of the most common and devastating natural disasters in California, causing units like the 140th Aviation Regiment to be used to support fire department efforts. Military Police are also utilized in massive evacuation efforts.

Historic units

 250th Air Defense Artillery Regiment (250th ADAR) (United States)
  251st Air Defense Artillery Regiment (251st ADAR)
  149th Armor Regiment
  185th Armor Regiment
 140th Aviation Regiment
  18th Cavalry Regiment
 111th Armored Cavalry Regiment (111th ACR)
 170th Cavalry Regiment
  143rd Field Artillery Regiment (143rd FAR)
  144th Field Artillery Regiment (144th FAR)
  159th Infantry Regiment
  160th Infantry Regiment
  184th Infantry Regiment
  185th Infantry Regiment
 223rd Infantry Regiment
  224th Infantry Regiment
 115th Quartermaster Regiment
 132nd Engineer Battalion

See also
Army National Guard Transformation – links to source material on transformation of the CA ARNG.
California State Guard
California Military Academy
List of armored and cavalry regiments of the United States Army
Militia
25th Infantry Division (United States) 
United States Army Reserve

References

 The California State Military Museum, California Militia and National Guard Unit Histories, Index to Militia Units of the State of California 1850-1881
 Inventory of the Military Department. Militia Companies Records, 1849-1880

External links

California Army National Guard Homepage
California Army National Guard on FaceBook

United States Army National Guard by state
Military in California
1903 establishments in California
Articles containing video clips